Wenyingzhuangia marina is a Gram-negative, strictly aerobic and heterotrophic  bacterium from the genus of Wenyingzhuangia which has been isolated from a recirculating mariculture system from Tianjin.

References

Flavobacteria
Bacteria described in 2014